Sodium ferrioxalate is a chemical compound with the formula . It is also called sodium oxalatoferrate or sodium trisoxalatoferrate.

The compound is a salt consisting of ferrioxalate anions, and sodium cations . The anion is a transition metal complex consisting of an iron atom in the +3 oxidation state and three bidentate oxalate ions  anions acting as ligands.

The ferrioxalate anion is sensitive to light and higher-energy electromagnetic radiation, which causes the decomposition of one oxalate to carbon dioxide  and reduction of the iron(III) atom to iron(II).

Properties

Solubility
This compound is very soluble in hot water, (182 parts per 100 parts solvent by mass), but a lot less soluble in cold water, (32 parts per 100 parts solvent), about the solubility of sodium chloride. It is not appreciably soluble in ethanol or ethanol water mixtures which are more than 50% ethanol by mass. It is somewhat more soluble in water than the corresponding potassium salt.

Preparation

Sodium ferrioxalate can be obtained by mixing solutions of sodium oxalate and ferric oxalate, and waiting a few hours for the brown colour of the ferric oxalate to be replaced with the green colour of the complex anion.
 3  +  → 2 
The equilibrium is attained only slowly at room temperature. The product can then be crystallized by evaporating the solution at just below boiling until small crystals appear, then allowing it to cool.  The product may also be precipitated by adding methanol or ethanol to the solution.

Some decomposition of the ferric oxalate may occur during the process, resulting in the canary-yellow insoluble iron(II) oxalate. Small amounts of hydrogen peroxide  may be added to keep the iron in the 3+ oxidation state.

Isomerism 
Theoretically the two stereoisomers could be separated by crystallization of a diastereomeric salt of the optically inactive racemic mixture of ferrioxalate ions with an optically active cation, such as Methyl-ethyl-propyl-ammonium ion which is one pure enantiomer. Thus Methyl-ethyl-propyl-ammonium ferrioxalate should crystallize out to produce crystals which are non superimposable mirror images. These would be Λ-Methyl-ethyl-propyl-ammonium Λ-ferrioxalate and Λ-Methyl-ethyl-propyl-ammonium Δ-ferrioxalate.

Photoreduction 
Some samples of the crystals were exposed to direct sunlight for a few hours, the larger crystals did not appear to be affected, however solutions and small crystals so exposed did change colour to a different shade of green.

See also
A number of other iron oxalates are known
 Iron(II) oxalate
 Iron(III) oxalate
 Potassium ferrioxalate

References

Iron complexes
Iron(III) compounds
Sodium compounds
Oxalato complexes